Elections were held in the Australian state of Queensland between 10 August 1883 and 30 October 1883 to elect the members of the state's Legislative Assembly.

Key dates
Due to problems of distance and communications, it was not possible to hold the elections on a single day. The elections were held in seven sets:

 Nominations: 10 August. Polling: 17 August. Electorates: Aubigny, Blackall, Dalby, Logan, Mackay, Maryborough (2 members), Mulgrave, Normanby, Port Curtis, Rockhampton (2 members)
 Nominations: 18 August. Polling: 21 August. Electorates: Bundamba, Enoggera (2 members), Fortitude Valley, Ipswich (2 members), North Brisbane (2 members), Oxley, Rosewood, South Brisbane (2 members)
 Nominations: 16 August (10 August for Bowen). Polling: 23 August. Electorates: Bowen, Leichhardt (2 members), Stanley (2 members)
 Nominations: 18 August. Polling: 21 August. Electorates: Bulimba, Clermont, Fassifern, Gympie, Maranoa, Moreton, Northern Downs, Townsville, Wide Bay (2 members)
 Nominations: 4 September (11 September for Carnarvon, 18 September for Drayton & Toowoomba, Warwick). Polling: 1 October. Electorates: Burnett, Carnarvon, Darling Downs (2 members), Drayton & Toowoomba (2 members), Warwick
 Nominations: 4 September. Polling: 5 October. Electorates: Balonne, Burke, Gregory, Kennedy (2 members), Mitchell, Warrego
 Nominations: 11 September. Polling: 30 October. Electorates: Cook (2 members)

See also
 Members of the Queensland Legislative Assembly, 1883–1888

References

Elections in Queensland
1883 elections in Australia
August 1883 events
September 1883 events
October 1883 events
1880s in Queensland